Makola may refer to:
 Makola, Ghana
 Makola, Sri Lanka